The canton of Montaigu-de-Quercy is a French former administrative division in the department of Tarn-et-Garonne and region Midi-Pyrénées. It had 2,570 inhabitants (2012). It was disbanded following the French canton reorganisation which came into effect in March 2015. It consisted of 6 communes, which joined the canton of Pays de Serres Sud-Quercy in 2015.

Communes 
The communes in the canton of Montaigu-de-Quercy:
 Montaigu-de-Quercy
 Belvèze
 Roquecor
 Saint-Amans-du-Pech
 Saint-Beauzeil
 Valeilles

References

Montaigu-de-Quercy
2015 disestablishments in France
States and territories disestablished in 2015